Covington is a city in the U.S. state of Georgia and the seat of Newton County, and is part of the Atlanta metropolitan area. As of the 2010 Census, its population 14,113.

History
Covington was founded by European immigrants to the United States. It was incorporated in 1821 as the seat of the newly organized Newton County. Covington was named for United States Army Brigadier General and United States Congressman Leonard Covington, a hero of the War of 1812. The settlement grew with the advent of the railroad in 1845. Covington incorporated as a city in 1854.

In 1864, General Sherman's troops marched through during their March to the Sea. Although they looted the city, destroying numerous buildings, several antebellum homes were spared.

Historic districts
The Covington Historic District and the North Covington Historic District within the city are both listed on the National Register of Historic Places. The maps and materials describing these two districts are available for review through City Hall. The Covington Historic District contains Floyd Street and the downtown square. The North Covington Historic District contains North Emory Street and Odum Street as its hub. Both districts have an ordinance to preserve their character, regulating changes proposed for properties, and special permits may be required.

The Covington Mill Village is also a vital part of local history. The Starrsville Historic District, site of the historic settlement of Starrsville, is in the exurban area around Covington. The Newton County Courthouse, brick store, and Salem campground are separately NRHP-listed.

Geography

Covington is located in north central Georgia, in the eastern part of Metro Atlanta. Interstate 20 runs to the north of the city, with access from exits 90, 92, and 93. U.S. Route 278 also runs through the city, leading east  to Rutledge and northwest  to Conyers, concurrent with I-20. Other highways that run through the city include Georgia State Routes 36, 81, and 142.
 

Climate

Demographics

As of the census of 2000, there were 11,547 people, 4,261 households, and 2,906 families residing in the city. The racial makeup of the city was 51.55% White, 45.54% Black, 0.18% Native American, 0.55% Asian, 0.04% Pacific Islander, 0.94% from other races, and 1.19% from two or more races. Hispanic or Latino of any race were 2.87% of the population.

There were 4,261 households, out of which 31.4% had children under the age of 18 living with them, 40.0% were married couples living together, 23.6% had a female householder with no husband present, and 31.8% were non-families. 26.8% of all households were made up of individuals, and 12.6% had someone living alone who was 65 years of age or older. The average household size was 2.62 and the average family size was 3.19.

In the city, the population was spread out, with 27.5% under the age of 18, 9.1% from 18 to 24, 27.7% from 25 to 44, 20.7% from 45 to 64, and 15.0% who were 65 years of age or older. The median age was 35 years. For every 100 females, there were 88.5 males. For every 100 females age 18 and over, there were 80.7 males.

The median income for a household in the city was $31,997, and the median income for a family was $36,408. Males had a median income of $29,622 versus $23,339 for females. The per capita income for the city was $15,554. About 14.8% of families and 19.6% of the population were below the poverty line, including 33.7% of those under age 18 and 12.8% of those age 65 or over.

Education

Newton County School District 
The Newton County School District holds pre-school to grade twelve, and consists of fourteen elementary schools, five middle schools, three high schools, an elementary theme school, and a charter school. The district has 853 full-time teachers and 13,681 students.

Private education
Grace Christian Academy
Montessori School of Covington
Providence Classical Christian School
Peachtree Academy
Covington Academy
Point of Grace Christian School
First Baptist Academy

Higher education
Georgia Piedmont Technical College - Covington Campus
Georgia Perimeter College - Newton County Campus
Emory University - Oxford Campus

Tourism events
Gaither's Plantation hosts a Fall Festival every year.
The Satsuki Garden Club conducts tours of historic houses in Covington every other Christmas.
The Vampire Diaries, Mystic Falls Tours

Economy
Archer Aviation's Midnight eVTOL air taxi is set to be manufactured in Covington by carmaker Stellantis (merger of Fiat Chrysler and Peugeot).

In film and television

Covington has been featured in numerous TV shows and movies since the 1950s.

Boycott (2001 TV movie)
A Man called Peter (1955)
False Face (1977)
The Dukes of Hazzard (1979, TV series, first 5 episodes)
The Prize Fighter (1979)
Little Darlings (1980)
The Cannonball Run (1981)
Coward of the County (1981, TV movie)
Door to Door (1985)
Jason Lives: Friday the 13th Part VI (1986)
Resting Place (1986, TV movie)
A Fathers Homecoming(1988)
In the Heat of the Night (1988–1995, TV series)
Sudie & Simpson (1990)
Carolina Skeletons (1991)
White Lie (1991)
Stay the Night (1991)
I'll Fly Away (1991–1992, TV series)
Grass Roots (1992)
The Secret Passion of Robert Clayton (1992)
My Cousin Vinny (1992)
Kalifornia (1993)
The Oldest Living Confederate Widow (1993)
A Passion for Justice: The Hazel Brannon Smith Story (1993)
Past the Bleachers (1994)
A Simple Twist of Fate (1994)
Savannah (1996, TV series)
Fled (1996)
Flash (1997, TV movie)
Miss Evers' Boys (1997 TV movie)
Remember the Titans (1999)
The Price of a Broken Heart (1999, TV movie)
Wayward Son (1999)
Run Ronnie Run (2000)
The Accountant (2001, short film)
Boycott (2001 film) (2001, TV movie)
TV Road Trip (2002, documentary)
Sweet Home Alabama (2002)
Autorequiem (2002)
The Fighting Temptations (2003)
Turbulance! (2004)
The Spy/Fancy Dress (2004)
Bobby Jones: Stroke of Genius (2004)
Three Wishes (2005, TV series, episode 3)
False River (2005)
Boxed In (2005)
Madea's Family Reunion (2006)
Dangerous Calling (2008)
Get Low (2009)
Halloween II (2009)
The Family That Preys (2009)
Fly By (2009)
The Vampire Diaries (2009–2017, TV series)
The Walking Dead (2010, TV series, episode 1)
Footloose (2011)
American Reunion (2012)
The Odd Life of Timothy Green (2012)
Selma (2014)
Taken 3 (2014)
Dolly Parton's Coat of Many Colors (2015, TV movie)
Vacation (2015)
Goosebumps 2: Haunted Halloween (2018)
Dumplin' (2018)
Legacies (2018-2022), TV series)
Doctor Sleep (2019)
Sweet Magnolias (2020, TV series)
Freaky (2020)

The American Barbecue Showdown (2020, TV series)
Jungle Cruise (film) (2021)

Notable people

George Adams, jazz tenor saxophonist
George T. Anderson - Confederate General during the Civil War
Leon Ashley - singer
Ben Morgan - Master Marine Salvage Expert
Boondox (David Hutto) - rapper on Majik Ninja Entertainment
Dale Carter - professional football player
Ellia English - actress best known for her role as Aunt Helen on the Jamie Foxx Show
Akeem Hunt- running back for the Ottawa Redblacks of the CFL
Andy Offutt Irwin award-winning storyteller and recording artist
Ryan Klesko - former Major League Baseball player
Lucius Quintus Cincinnatus Lamar (II) - politician, Secretary of the Interior for Grover Cleveland - Associate Justice of the Supreme Court
Demetrius McCray - football player, cornerback
Dinah Watts Pace - educator, operated an orphanage in the area
Sheldon Rankins- defensive tackle for the New Orleans Saints of the NFL
Jake Reed - former professional football player
Steadman Vincent Sanford - Chancellor of the University System of Georgia
Eric Stokes - American football cornerback
Lizzie Wilkerson - African-American folk artist

See also

Main Street Bank, former local bank

References

External links

 The City of Covington official site
 Downtown Covington
 The Covington/Newton County Chamber of Commerce

Cities in Georgia (U.S. state)
Cities in Newton County, Georgia
County seats in Georgia (U.S. state)
Geography of Newton County, Georgia
Historic districts in Metro Atlanta
Second Empire architecture in Georgia (U.S. state)
Italianate architecture in Georgia (U.S. state)
1820s architecture in the United States
1822 establishments in Georgia (U.S. state)
Historic districts on the National Register of Historic Places in Georgia (U.S. state)
National Register of Historic Places in Newton County, Georgia